Jano is a town and municipality in the north west of the Honduran department of Olancho, west of Guata, south of Esquipulas del Norte and north of Manto.

Villages 
Jano municipality encompasses the following villages:
 Jano
 Comayaguela
 El Zapotillo
 La Pita
 La Victoria
 Las Labranzas
 Pacaya
 Pintora

Demographics
At the time of the 2013 Honduras census, Jano municipality had a population of 4,553. Of these, 90.97% were Mestizo, 8.15% White, 0.51% Black or Afro-Honduran and 0.37% Indigenous.

References 

Municipalities of the Olancho Department